Theodore Bernard Washington (born February 16, 1948) is a former American football linebacker in the National Football League (NFL). He played eleven seasons with the Houston Oilers, playing outside linebacker.  Washington attended George S. Middleton High School in Tampa, graduated from Tuskegee Institute High School in Tuskegee, Alabama and later played collegiate football at Mississippi Valley State University. Washington earned a bachelor's degree in Health and Physical Education from MVSU, a master's degree in Guidance and Counseling from Tuskegee University, and devoted his life to Christian ministry following retirement from the NFL.  He is the father of former NFL player Ted Washington Jr.

References

1948 births
Living people
American football linebackers
Houston Oilers players
Mississippi Valley State Delta Devils football players
Players of American football from Tampa, Florida
African-American players of American football
21st-century African-American people
20th-century African-American sportspeople